Liangxiang is a town and an area of Beijing, Fangshan District, located 25 km southwest of the city center. It borders Gongchen Subdistrict to its north, Changyang Town to its east, Doudian Town to its south, and Yancun Town to its west. It had 24,317 registered inhabitants as of 2020.

History
Liangxiang county was established 2,000 years ago during the Qin Dynasty. Its name came from the Chinese saying '人物俱良', literally 'people and goods all gather in Liang', indicating significant economic activities in the past. As the land is relative fertile and flat, it was suitable for agriculture, contributing to its prosperity.
In 1958, Liangxiang county (良乡县) merged with Fangshan county and was renamed Liangxiang town (良乡镇). On January 24, 2002, another merger with Guandao (官道镇) took place. The new Liangxiang township became the political, cultural and economic centre of Fangshan district and houses the district seat.

Infrastructure

6th Ring Road and Jingshi Expressway have exist connecting to Liangxiang. A small military airport is situated next to one of the exits, in the northwest. Basic facilities such as postal offices, telecommunication offices, 2 day care centers, 14 primary and secondary schools and a hospital are also present.

Recently, a few universities including Capital Normal University, Beijing Institute of Technology, Capital University of Medical Sciences and Beijing Technology and Business University decided to open additional campuses in the new University Town of Liangxiang, which houses over 100,000 students.

Transport

Beijing Subway
Public transportation access has improved since opening of the Fangshan line of Beijing Subway, with 4 stations within Liangxiang (Liangxiang Nanguan, Liangxiang Univ. Town North, Liangxiang Univ. Town and Liangxiang Univ. Town West).

China Railway
Beijing-Guangzhou Railway pass through Liangxiang. Liangxiang railway station is located in Liangxiang.

Bus
Bus lines 616, 646 and 917 can be used to get to Beijing city centre.

Landmark
Historical heritages such as Haotian Pagoda, Yue Yi Tomb, Liangxiang Confucius Temple (良乡文庙) and Xiuyunguan (岫云观 or 良乡离宫) are popular tourist attractions.

Administrative divisions
In 2021, Liangxiang contained 2 communities and 16 administrative villages (行政村).

See also
Beijing
Fangshan District
Haotian Pagoda
List of township-level divisions of Beijing

References

External links
Official Government website (in Chinese)

Fangshan District
Towns in Beijing
Areas of Beijing